Mahjong Tales: Ancient Wisdom is a board game available from the PlayStation Network and Games for Windows – LIVE, and available for download Via the PlayStation Store and Games on Demand. The game was released January 8, 2009 in United States for the PlayStation 3. The game was developed by Creat Studios and published by Creat Studios & TikGames.

Gameplay
Mahjong Tales combines the features of Mahjong into a single game featuring a narrated story mode that whisks players away into a storybook adventure, revealing hand-illustrated ancient Chinese tales. Mahjong Tales delivers multiple game modes and features trophy support.

Reception
IGN:5.2

References

2007 video games
Games for Windows certified games
Mahjong video games
Microsoft games
Multiplayer and single-player video games
PlayStation 3 games
PlayStation Network games
TikGames games
Video games developed in Russia
Video games scored by Laura Shigihara
Windows games